Herpetopoma ludiviniae is a species of sea snail, a marine gastropod mollusc in the family Chilodontidae.

Description
The size of the shell varies between 2.7 mm and 4.5 mm.

Distribution
This marine species occurs off the Philippines.

References

 Poppe G.T., Tagaro S.P. & Dekker H. (2006) The Seguenziidae, Chilodontidae, Trochidae, Calliostomatidae and Solariellidae of the Philippine Islands. Visaya Supplement 2: 1-228.
 Vilvens, C. (2017). New species and new records of Chilodontidae (Gastropoda: Vetigastropoda: Seguenzioidea) from the Pacific Ocean. Novapex, Hors Série. 11: 1-67.

External links
 

ludiviniae
Gastropods described in 2006